Chad Dimitri Wright (born 25 March 1991) is a Jamaican athlete specialising in the discus throw.  He has qualified for the Tokyo 2021 Olympics in the Men's Discus.  He has represented Jamaica at the 2015 Beijing World Championships of Athletics and also at the 2019 Doha World Athletics Championships.
He is a 2 time national champion in the men's discus.
He is the 2013 Central American and Caribbean Games champion in the discus. He finished sixth at the 2014 Commonwealth Games and fourth at the 2015 Summer Universiade.
He is the 2012 NCAA Discus Champion while representing the University of Nebraska - Lincoln.

Competition record

Personal bests
Outdoor
Shot put – 19.39 (Columbus 2013)
Discus throw – 66.54 (Excelsior High School - 08 Feb 2020)
Indoor
Shot put – 19.02 (Geneva 2014)

References
https://worldathletics.org/athletes/jamaica/chad-wright-14413487

1991 births
Living people
Sportspeople from Kingston, Jamaica
Jamaican male shot putters
Jamaican male discus throwers
Commonwealth Games competitors for Jamaica
Athletes (track and field) at the 2014 Commonwealth Games
World Athletics Championships athletes for Jamaica
Athletes (track and field) at the 2020 Summer Olympics
Olympic athletes of Jamaica